Carson Michael Wiggs (born February 20, 1990) is an American football placekicker who is currently a free agent. He was signed by the Seahawks as an undrafted free agent in 2012. Wiggs played college football at Purdue.

Early years
Wiggs attended South Grand Prairie High School in Grand Prairie, Texas. As a senior, he was invited to participate in the Under Armour All-America Game in January 2008. He was also named honorable mention all-state and first-team all-district as both punter and kicker, after averaging 37 yards per punt and making 8 of 13 field goals, while still maintaining his grades to earn honorable mention academic all-state. Wiggs made 15 of 23 field goals and 67 of 69 PAT attempts for his career.

Wiggs committed to Purdue University on June 12, 2007. Wiggs wasn't heavily recruited, as he also had two other FBS scholarship offers from New Mexico State and Louisiana Tech.

College career

Statistics
Source:

Professional career

Seattle Seahawks
He was considered as one of the better kicking prospects for the 2012 NFL Draft, as he was one of the few kickers selected to participate in the NFL Combine, but he was not selected during the draft. He signed with the Seattle Seahawks as an undrafted free agent. On August 19, 2013, he was cut by the Seahawks.

Indianapolis Colts
Wiggs signed with the Indianapolis Colts on March 18, 2014.

References

External links
Purdue Boilermakers bio

Living people
1990 births
People from Grand Prairie, Texas
Players of American football from Texas
American football placekickers
Purdue Boilermakers football players
Seattle Seahawks players
Indianapolis Colts players